The University of North Carolina Board of Governors, known more commonly as the UNC Board of Governors, is the governing body of the University of North Carolina system. The board is composed of 24 members, selected by the state legislature.

Overview

The board is charged with “the general determination, control, supervision, management, and governance” of the UNC system, a system of 17 campuses. The current form of the Board was created in 1971. One of the large roles of the board is the election of the UNC System President, currently Peter Hans.

The board must elect a chair, vice chair, and secretary from within its voting membership for two-year terms that begin on July 1 of even-numbered years. The current executives are Randall C. Ramsey serving as chair, Wendy Floyd Murphy serving as vice chair, and Pearl Burris-Floyd serving as secretary.

History

The Board of Governors was created in 1971 under Governor  Bob Scott, replacing a previous system that was composed of a 100 person board that managed 6 state funded universities, and a State Board of Higher Education that managed 9 other universities. This centralized the governance of all public universities in the state by creating a 32 member board of governors for the UNC System, a board of trustees and chancellor for each university.

In 2019, Governor Cooper signed legislation to reduce the size of the Board of Governors to 24.

References

University of North Carolina
Government of North Carolina
Governing bodies of universities and colleges in the United States